Henderson County High School (HCHS) is the only high school in Henderson County, Kentucky and is among the largest high schools in Kentucky, with nearly 2000 students enrolled in grades 9–12 each year.

History

Henderson County High School was established in 1954, per the merger of various individual high schools outside of the Henderson city limits. Its first home was at 1707 Second Street in Henderson. It relocated to its current premises on 2424 Zion Road (which is actually farther down the same road as its previous home) in 1969. In 1976, the other high school in Henderson County, Henderson City High School, closed, and all of its students moved to Henderson County High School.

North Middle School is located on the old High School grounds at 1707 Second Street.

Structure

Currently, the school is divided into four student units that cut across all grade levels; red, green, blue and the career and technical unit which act somewhat as separately functioning high schools. Students from different units can have classes outside their home unit. Each unit has its own set of principals and guidance counselors equipped to meet each student's needs. All the units also share a coordinating principal with overall control for the school. There is also a technology education unit in the school.

Sports

Organizations and groups

References

External links
 

Educational institutions established in 1954
Schools in Henderson County, Kentucky
Public high schools in Kentucky
1954 establishments in Kentucky
Henderson, Kentucky